Viqarunnisa Noon School and College, also known as VNSC, is an all-girls higher secondary school and college in Dhaka, Bangladesh. It has 25,000 students at four campuses in the city. It is named after Viqar un Nisa Noon.

History 
The school began as Ramna Preparatory School in 1947. Austrian Pakistani social worker Begum Viqar un Nisa Noon, wife of the then-governor of East Pakistan, Firoz Khan Noon, was impressed when she visited in 1950. With her support the school moved to its current Baily Road location, where it was renamed in her honour.

It expanded very soon to a high school and, in 1956, prepared students for the Senior Cambridge Examination.

In 1978, it started a college section with higher secondary courses.

Campuses

The main campus in Bailey Road covers about 6 acres of land. With growing admissions, the school eventually introduced multiple sections, afternoon shifts, and three branch campuses in Dhaka at Dhanmondi, Azimpur, and Bashundhara. Dhanmondi Address: House No.6, Road No.8, Dhanmondi R/A, Dhaka-1205. Bashundhara Address: Road No.6, 181/F, Bashundhara R/A, Dhaka.

Curriculum
There are English version and Bengali-medium courses of study in three programmes: humanities (only Bengali - medium), science (both English version and Bengali - medium), and business studies (both English version and Bengali - medium). As of 2012, the school had 650 teachers. Enrollment is more than 30,000 students. Only girls are admitted. The school and college section admits students from all branches of the school and from other areas of Bangladesh.

Controversy

Corruption 
The Ministry of Education removed Principal Faugia Rezwan for allegedly making an "offer" to an official.

Sexual Harassment 
A teacher of Viqarunnisa, Parimal Joydhar, sexually assaulted a Class X student and recorded her on his phone. He also threatened her by saying he would release the recordings on the internet. The victim wrote complaints to school authorities, but they did not take any steps. This led to massive criticism and caused protests. The teacher was sentenced to life imprisonment on 25 November 2015.

Suicide of Aritry Odhikari 
A ninth grade student, Aritry Odhikari, committed suicide after being insulted by school authorities. This incident received nation-wide attention and sparked protests. Education Minister Nurul Islam Nahid said the incident was "painful and tragic". A probe by the Ministry of Education found various irregularities within the school administration. Two teachers were indicted by the court. Arrest warrants have been issued against them.

See also 
 Adamjee Cantonment College
 Dhaka College
 Holy Cross College, Dhaka
 Notre Dame College, Dhaka
 Viqarunnisa University
 Ishwarganj Bisweswari Pilot High School

References

External links
 

Educational institutions established in 1952
Girls' schools in Bangladesh
Schools in Dhaka District
1952 establishments in East Pakistan
Viqarunnisa Noon School and College